The 1962 Sacramento State Hornets football team represented Sacramento State College—now known as California State University, Sacramento—as a member of the Far Western Conference (FWC) during the 1962 NCAA College Division football season. Led by second-year head coach Ray Clemons, Sacramento State compiled an overall record of 2–7 with a mark of 2–3 in conference play, tying for fourth place in the FWC. For the season the team was outscored by its opponents 161 to 122. The Hornets played home games at Charles C. Hughes Stadium in Sacramento, California.

Schedule

Notes

References

Sacramento State
Sacramento State Hornets football seasons
Sacramento State Hornets football